Vriesea platynema is a plant species in the genus Vriesea. This species is native to the West Indies and South America.

Three varieties are recognized:

Vriesea platynema var. flava Reitz - State of Santa Catarina in Brazil
Vriesea platynema var. platynema - Cuba, Jamaica, Trinidad, Venezuela (including Venezuelan Antilles), Guyana, Brazil, Misiones Province of Argentina 
Vriesea platynema var. wrightii (L.B.Sm.) L.B.Sm. - Cuba

Cultivars
 Vriesea 'Cadbury'
 Vriesea 'Charles W.'
 Vriesea 'Filagree'
 Vriesea 'Golden Plaits'
 Vriesea 'Griesseniana'
 Vriesea 'Karamea Granada'
 Vriesea 'RoRo'

References

platynema
Flora of the Caribbean
Flora of South America
Plants described in 1843
Flora without expected TNC conservation status